Petru-Alexandru Luncanu (born 7 May 1989) is a Romanian professional tennis player playing on the ITF Men's Circuit and the ATP Challenger Tour and is a current member of the Romania Davis Cup Team. On 2 November 2009 he reached his highest ATP singles ranking of 304 whilst his highest doubles ranking was 286 achieved on 2 November 2015.

Davis Cup

Singles performances (0–2)

References

External links

1989 births
Living people
Tennis players from Bucharest
Romanian male tennis players
21st-century Romanian people